Dynamical Theory of Crystal Lattices is a book in solid state physics, authored collaboratively by Max Born and Kun Huang. The book was originally started by Born in c. 1940, and was finished in the 1950s by Huang in consultation with Born. The text is considered a classical treatise on the subject of lattice dynamics, phonon theory, and elasticity in crystalline solids, but excluding metals and other complex solids with order/disorder phenomena. J. D. Eshelby, Melvin Lax, and A. J. C. Wilson reviewed the book in 1955, among several others.

See also 
 Bibliography of Max Born
 Introduction to Solid State Physics

References

External links 
 

1954 non-fiction books
Physics textbooks
Max Born